Lambert Beverly Halstead (13 June 1933 – 30 April 1991), who also went by Lambert Beverly Halstead Tarlo or just Beverly Halstead, was a British paleontologist and professor of Geology & Zoology and popularizer of science. He was noted for his candid theories of dinosaur sexual habits, and also for a prolonged assault on phylogenetic systematics (or "cladism", as he referred to it), in a series of letters and editorials to the journal Nature in the late 1970s and early 1980s.

He was President of the Geologists' Association for 1990–91.

References

  Republished in W.A.S. Sarjeant (ed.), Vertebrate fossils and the evolution of scientific concepts. Writings in tribute to Beverly Halstead. Reading, England: Gordon & Breach Publishers, 1995.
 

1933 births
1991 deaths
British palaeontologists
Presidents of the Geologists' Association